Orre is a village and parish in Klepp municipality in Rogaland county, Norway. The village is located just southwest of the lake Orrevatnet, between the lake and the ocean. Orre is the location of the Orrestranda beach, one of the longest sand beaches in Norway. The area is very flat, and it is primarily used for agriculture. The Old Orre Church, built in the 1200s, is located in Orre.

Media gallery

References

Villages in Rogaland
Klepp